Clay LeGrand (February 26, 1911 – November 17, 2002) was a justice of the Iowa Supreme Court from July 5, 1967, to February 26, 1983, appointed from Scott County, Iowa. LeGrand died on November 17, 2002, at the age of 91.

References

External links

Justices of the Iowa Supreme Court
2002 deaths
Place of birth missing
1911 births
20th-century American judges